Heroes' Day is a national public holiday in Namibia. It is recognized by the United Nations as Namibia Day. Celebrated annually on 26 August, the day commemorates the Namibian War of Independence which began on 26 August 1966 at Omugulugwombashe.

Origin

In 1966 the United Nations General Assembly revoked South Africa's mandate to govern South West African territory and placed it under direct UN administration. South Africa refused to recognize this resolution. South West Africa People's Organization (SWAPO) at that time prepared for armed resistance and founded its armed wing, the People's Liberation Army of Namibia (PLAN) in 1962. Many of its erstwhile commanders were in exile but PLAN began to infiltrate the north of Namibia to establish training camps. Omugulugwombashe was one such training camp, established in June 1966 by PLAN commander John Ya Otto Nankudhu.  The group under Nankudhu had just started to build defensive structures and planned to train about 90 soldiers there.

On 26 August 1966, eight helicopters of the South African Defence Force attacked the guerrilla fighters at Omugulugwombashe. At the time of attack there were only 17 soldiers in the camp. It was the first armed battle of the War. Omugulugwombashe is declared as one of the Heroes Acre in Namibia, and it is a settlement in the Tsandi electoral constituency in the Omusati Region of northern Namibia.

In commemoration of the day, 26 August is a public holiday in Namibia. It is recognized by the United Nations as Namibia Day but Namibians refer to it as Heroes' Day.

Proceedings
National celebrations take place annually at different places, usually in the north of Namibia near important battle zones.  Hundreds of people annually gather to watch leaders officially commemorate veterans of the People's Liberation Army of Namibia (PLAN). Likewise, honours, such as military medals, are handed out on the day. Heroes' Acre, a war memorial outside of Windhoek, was opened on Heroes' Day in 2002. It is also the same day that the United Nations Institute for Namibia, a tertiary educational body in Zambia under the auspices of the United Nations and forerunner to the University of Namibia, was inaugurated in 1976.

Herero Day

The Battle of Waterberg on 11 August 1904 was the final battle of the Herero Wars.  Following the defeat of the Herero force, the surviving Hereros fled under the leadership of Samuel Maharero, who died in exile in the Transvaal. After his death on 14 March 1923, the South African administration of South West Africa granted permission for his reburial at Okahandja, unaware of the role it would play as a commemoration of anti-colonialisation and a symbol of nationalism.

The reburial ceremony on 26 August 1923 was attended by 3,000 Hereros and by 100 Whites, including high-ranking government officials.  Since then, Herero Day is held annually as a gesture of resistance, unity and loyalty, as well as defiance against colonisation, particularly that by the Germans.

References

Public holidays in Namibia
History of Namibia
August observances
Heroes